The list of shipwrecks in October 1865 includes ships sunk, foundered, grounded, or otherwise lost during October 1865.

1 October

2 October

3 October

4 October

5 October

6 October

7 October

8 October

9 October

10 October

11 October

12 October

14 October

15 October

16 October

17 October

18 October

19 October

20 October

21 October

22 October

23 October

24 October

25 October

26 October

27 October

28 October

29 October

30 October

31 October

Unknown date

References

Notes

Bibliography
 Gaines, W. Craig, Encyclopedia of Civil War Shipwrecks, Louisiana State University Press, 2008 , .
 Ingram, C. W. N., and Wheatley, P. O., (1936) Shipwrecks: New Zealand disasters 1795–1936. Dunedin, NZ: Dunedin Book Publishing Association.

1865-10
Maritime incidents in October 1865